Kotranka or Kot Ranka is a Sub division of Rajouri district in the union territory of Jammu and Kashmir, India. 

It is situated on the banks of Ans River (a tributary of the Chenab River), which falls under the Southern range of Peer Panchal. 

The distance between Rajouri and Kotranka is 39 km, kotranka is 20 km from Budhal.

References 

Villages in Rajouri district
Cities and towns in Rajouri district
Tehsils in Rajouri district